Hakaraia Pahewa (1869–1948) was a New Zealand  Anglican minister. Of Māori descent, he identified with the Ngāti Porou iwi. He was born in Tokomaru Bay on the East Coast of New Zealand's North Island in about 1869.

References

1869 births
1948 deaths
New Zealand Māori religious leaders
New Zealand Anglican priests
Ngāti Porou people
People from Tokomaru Bay